Scott Speiser (/skot spizerʃ/ SKOT SPIZE-er) is an American actor and writer. He starred as Overkill in Amazon's remake of The Tick television series. He is a longtime member of the Blue Man Group stage show, and was previously a member of The Groundlings Sunday Company improvisational comedy troupe.

Career
Speiser guest starred on NCIS as Agent Rafi Ali.

Speiser guest starred on Agents of S.H.I.E.L.D. as Senior Airman Campbell. 

Speiser guest starred on Mike & Molly.

References

External links

1980 births
Living people
People from Chapel Hill, North Carolina
Male actors from North Carolina
American male television actors
21st-century American male actors